The 2012 Kerrick Sports Sedan Series was an Australian motor racing competition for Group 3D Sports Sedans. The series commenced on 14 April at Mallala Motor Sport Park and concluded on 14 October at Wakefield Park after fifteen races. 2012 was the 28th year in which a national championship or national series for Sports Sedans had been contested in Australia.

Kerry Baily claimed his sixth Sports Sedan title after winning the first five races of the series and consistently finishing on the podium. Former champions Tony Ricciardello and Darren Hossack overcame a difficult first round, which saw both of them borrow another competitor's car, to finish second and third in the series.

Teams and drivers

The following drivers competed in the 2012 Kerrick Sports Sedan Series.

Automobile eligibility
Each automobile competing in the series was required to comply with the provisions of one of the following classes:
 Class SS: Sports Sedans complying with the Group 3D Sports Sedans regulations as published in the CAMS Manual of Motor Sport
 Class TA: Trans-am cars complying with 2012 SCCA (Sports Car Club of America) Pro Racing Regulations

Race calendar
The 2012 Kerrick Sports Sedan Series was contested over five rounds, each of which was held at Shannons Nationals Motor Racing Championships rounds.

Points system 
The point score system was given a major overhaul in 2012. The emphasis on the three races which made up each round was changed, placing a sliding scale on race length and points value with the third race worth twice as many points as the first race with the second race splitting the difference.

Series standings

References

External links
 Kerrick Sports Sedan Series - 2012 Pointscore, sportssedansnational.com.au, as archived at web.archive.org
 Gallery 2012, www.sportssedans.com.au, as archived at web.archive.org 
 National Sports Sedan Series - official website
 Natsoft Race Results, racing.natsoft.com.au > Circuit Racing > Year = 2012

National Sports Sedan Series
Sports Sedans